Brett Drewitt (born 24 November 1990) is an Australian professional golfer from Sydney, Australia. In 2014, Drewitt played on PGA Tour China, winning the United Investment Real Estate Wuhan Open and finishing third on the Order of Merit. This earned him status on the Web.com Tour for the 2015 season; he finished 93rd on the money list and failed to qualify for the Web.com Tour Finals, but improved his status for 2016 via the Web.com Tour Qualifying Tournament, where he finished tied for 21st. Drewitt graduated from the Web.com Tour Finals in 2016.

Amateur wins
2010 Queensland Amateur, Pacific Northwest Amateur
2011 SA Classic, Four Nations Cup (individual champion)
2012 New South Wales Amateur

Professional wins (2)

Korn Ferry Tour wins (1)

PGA Tour China wins (1)

Results in major championships

CUT = missed the halfway cut

Team appearances
Amateur
Australian Men's Interstate Teams Matches (representing New South Wales): 2010, 2011, 2012 (winners), 2013

See also
2016 Web.com Tour Finals graduates
2021 Korn Ferry Tour Finals graduates

External links

Australian male golfers
PGA Tour golfers
Korn Ferry Tour graduates
Golfers from Sydney
1990 births
Living people